Gamma-aminobutyric acid receptor-associated protein-like 2 is a protein that in humans is encoded by the GABARAPL2 gene.

Interactions 

GABARAPL2 has been shown to interact with ULK1, ATG4B, and FAM134B.

References

Further reading